Matt Helm is a fictional character created by American author Donald Hamilton (1916-2006). Helm is a U.S. government counter-agent, a man whose primary job is to kill or nullify enemy agents—not a spy or secret agent in the ordinary sense of the term as used in most spy thrillers.

Helm appeared in 27 adventure/suspense novels by Hamilton, first published in 1960, and the character was later adapted into film, television and other media.

The character and the series
Published between 1960 and 1993, the 27 books in the series portrayed Helm, who acquired the code name "Eric" during his secret wartime assignments, as jaded, ruthless, pragmatic, and competent.  The series was noted for its between-books continuity, which was somewhat rare for the genre.  In the later books,  Helm's origins as a man of action in World War II disappeared and he became an apparently ageless character, a common fate of long-running fictional heroes.

The first book in the series, Death of a Citizen, takes place in the summer of 1958, 13 years after the end of the war. In the book, other characters describe Helm as verging on middle age and apparently soft and out of shape, although no specific age for him is given. In the next story, which apparently takes place in the summer of 1959, a hostile agent from a rival American spy organization taunts Helm as a shopworn 36-year-old and clearly over the hill as a physical specimen. Later in the book, Helm himself says that he is 36 years old. Writer Hayford Peirce examined the issue of Helm's age, and found this figure to be improbably young given the information about Helm's background in Death of a Citizen.  Peirce postulated that Helm was actually several years older than the 36 years mentioned in The Wrecking Crew and that he was probably born around 1918. By The Betrayers, the tenth book, the age issue vanishes completely.

Critic Anthony Boucher wrote: "Donald Hamilton has brought to the spy novel the authentic hard realism of Dashiell Hammett; and his stories are as compelling, and probably as close to the sordid truth of espionage, as any now being told." Golden Age mystery writer John Dickson Carr began reviewing books for Ellery Queen's Mystery Magazine in 1969.  According to Carr's biographer, "Carr found Donald Hamilton's Matt Helm to be 'my favorite secret agent,'" although Hamilton's books had little in common with Carr's.  "The explanation may lie in Carr's comment that in espionage novels he preferred Matt Helm's 'cloud-cuckooland' land. Carr never valued realism in fiction."

Matt Helm in film and television

In 1965, Columbia Pictures acquired the film rights to eight Matt Helm novels. A five-film parody or spoof spy movie series was planned and four were produced, debuting with The Silencers (from Hamilton's novels The Silencers and Death of a Citizen, adapted by acclaimed A Streetcar Named Desire screenwriter Oscar Saul). They were made to star Dean Martin, who co-produced with his Meadway-Claude Production company and received a partnership in the films. The series was produced by Irving Allen, former partner of James Bond film producer Albert R. Broccoli.

The films used the name Matt Helm, his cover identity, plus book titles and some very loose plot elements, but otherwise the series bore no resemblance to the character, atmosphere, or themes of Hamilton's original books, nor to the hard-edged action of Bond. 

Martin played the part with his own persona of a fun-loving, easygoing, wisecracking playboy with plenty of references to singing and alcohol consumption. Although unnamed in the novels, Helm's department was called Intelligence and Counter-Espionage (ICE) in the films. Like Bond, Helm featured a number of "sexy" women in each, sometimes referred to as "The Slaygirls". Martin co-starred in the films with popular '60s actresses such as  Stella Stevens, Ann-Margret, Sharon Tate, Elke Sommer, Janice Rule and Tina Louise.

A 1970s TV series Matt Helm, which cast Tony Franciosa as Helm, an ex-spy turned private detective, also departed from the books and was unsuccessful.

In 2002, it was reported that DreamWorks had optioned the entire Helm book series. In 2005, Variety reported that DreamWorks had signed Michael Brandt and Derek Haas to write a screenplay for a high six-figure deal. According to the article, the film was to be a contemporary adaptation of the character, but no casting or release information was announced.

Paramount retained the film rights to the Matt Helm series after its 2008 split from DreamWorks. In 2009, it was reported that Alex Kurtzman and Roberto Orci would produce a more serious version of the Helm franchise, with Variety saying that the tone of Paul Attanasio's script had a similar tone to The Bourne Identity, and that Steven Spielberg was considering directing or producing.

In March 2018, Deadline Hollywood reported that Tom Shepard had been hired to rewrite the script, with Bradley Cooper attached to play Helm. Spielberg reportedly would remain involved in some unspecified capacity.

Books

(all by Donald Hamilton)
Death of a Citizen (1960)
The Wrecking Crew (1960)
The Removers (1961)
The Silencers (1962)
Murderers' Row (1962)
The Ambushers (1963)
The Shadowers (1964)
The Ravagers (1964)
The Devastators (1965)
The Betrayers (1966)
The Menacers (1968)
The Interlopers (1969)
The Poisoners (1971)
The Intriguers (1972)
The Intimidators (1974)
The Terminators (1975)
The Retaliators (1976)
The Terrorizers (1977)
The Revengers (1982)
The Annihilators (1983)
The Infiltrators (1984)
The Detonators (1985)
The Vanishers (1986)
The Demolishers (1987)
The Frighteners (1989)
The Threateners (1992)
The Damagers (1993)
The Dominators – unpublished. Hamilton finished this novel in the late 1990s, and was reportedly revising it in preparation for seeking a publisher in mid-2002.

All of Hamilton's Matt Helm novels were first published in the United States by Fawcett Publications under their Gold Medal imprint.

These titles have since been republished by Titan Books.

Films
(all starring Dean Martin as Helm)
The Silencers (1966)
Murderers' Row (1966)
The Ambushers (1967)
The Wrecking Crew (1969)

A fifth film was planned, based upon the novel The Ravagers, but Martin declined the opportunity to play the role once more, even though the title of the film was announced at the end of The Wrecking Crew.

Box office performance

Home media
Murderer's Row was initially released on VHS in 1980, with reissues in 1987 and 1993. The Ambushers was released on VHS in 1987, with a reissue in 1996. The Silencers and The Wrecking Crew were both released on VHS only in 1996, with no reissues for either film. The 1996 releases consisted of 2 box sets, one containing Murderer's Row and The Ambushers, with the other containing The Silencers and The Wrecking Crew. It is unknown if these releases were sold exclusively as box sets, or if they were also issued individually. A 4-DVD box set containing the four films was released in North America in December 2005.

Television series

A television series loosely based upon Hamilton's character was launched by the ABC Network in 1975. Titled simply Matt Helm, the series starred Anthony Franciosa as a retired spy who becomes a private detective. After being launched by a pilot TV movie, it ran for only 14 episodes.

Manga 
In Japan, Jin Kimura, also known as  drew , based on the novel, in the magazine Boy's Life, November 1968 – March 1969.

References

Further reading
 John Dickson Carr, The Man Who Explained Miracles, by Douglas G. Greene, New York, 1995
Encyclopedia of Mystery and Detection, by Chris Steinbrunner and Otto Penzler, New York, 1976, 
"Spielberg Spying Matt Helm: Secret Agent May Be Subject of Director's Next Film", by Michael Fleming, Variety, Wed., Jul. 29, 2009

External links
Article on the history of the Matt Helm films: "Mr Helm Goes to Hollywood," November 14, 2011. Cinema Retro.

Helm, Matt
Novel series
Helm, Matt
American film series